Herkheim is a part of the municipality of Nördlingen in Germany, about one hundred kilometres east of Stuttgart.

Twinning
Herkheim is twinned with:
  Ilfracombe, England

References

Towns in Bavaria
Nördlingen